The Diocese of Macerata-Tolentino was a Roman Catholic diocese in Italy founded in 1586 from a merger of the Diocese of Macerata and the Diocese of Tolentino.  In 1986 it became the Diocese of Macerata-Tolentino-Recanati-Cingoli-Treia

References

External links
 GCatholic.org
 Catholic Hierarchy

Former Roman Catholic dioceses in Italy
Roman Catholic dioceses in le Marche
Religious organizations established in the 1580s
1586 establishments in Italy
Roman Catholic dioceses established in the 16th century

it:Diocesi di Macerata-Tolentino-Recanati-Cingoli-Treia